The Mall of Lahore (Lahor Khareedari Markaz), is a shopping mall, located in Lahore, Punjab, Pakistan. The mall was constructed by the Bahria. The Chief Executive Officer of the mall is Ali Ahmad Riaz Malik.

References

External links
 

Retailing in Lahore
Shopping malls in Lahore
Bahria Town
Shopping malls in Pakistan
Lahore Cantonment